HMS Snowdrop was a  of the Royal Navy. She served during the Second World War.

She was built at Smiths Dock Co., Ltd. South Bank on Tees and launched on 12 May 1941. She was sold on 17 May 1947 and scrapped on the Tyne in September 1949.

References

External links
HMS Snowdrop

 

Flower-class corvettes of the Royal Navy
1941 ships